Victoria Haralabidou (born 23 October 1971), is a Greek-Australian actress. She was born in Saint Petersburg, USSR. When she was 15 years old, her family moved to Athens, Greece. In 2005, she moved to Sydney, Australia, where she lives.

Stage
Her acting credits include Dear Elena, a contemporary Russian play by Liudmila Razumovskaya (Best Actress award 2001), Curse of the Starving Class by Sam Shepard.

Filmography

Film

Television

External links
 
 ABC review
 Hollywood.com
 The Age review
 Behind the Scenes Review
 ABC At The Movies Thirst reviewed 21 March 2012

1971 births
Living people
Soviet emigrants to Greece
Greek actresses
Greek emigrants to Australia
Soviet people of Greek descent
Australian film actresses
Australian stage actresses
Australian television actresses
Actresses from Saint Petersburg